Reuben Wilson (born April 9, 1935) is a jazz organist. He performs soul jazz and acid jazz, and is best known for his title track "Got to Get Your Own".

He was born in Mounds, Oklahoma and his family moved to Pasadena when he was 5.
He played in Los Angeles with drummer Al Bartee, then moved to New York to begin a recording career. In addition to playing with jazz musicians Melvin Sparks and Willis Jackson, Wilson led the local band Wildare Express. He remains an active musician, and still resides in New York City.

Discography

As leader 
 On Broadway (Blue Note, 1968)
 Love Bug (Blue Note, 1969)
 Blue Mode (Blue Note, 1970) – recorded in 1969. also issued as Organ Talk (Vee Jay, 1974).
 A Groovy Situation (Blue Note, 1970) – CD reissue (Water Records, 2004)
 Set Us Free (Blue Note, 1971)
 The Sweet Life (Groove Merchant, 1972) – CD reissue (Connoisseur Collection, 2000)
 The Cisco Kid (Groove Merchant, 1973) – CD reissue (Connoisseur Collection, 2000)
 Got to Get Your Own (Cadet, 1975) – CD reissue (Dusty Groove, 2008)
 Live at SOB's – The Official Bootleg (Jazzateria, 1996)
 Organ Donor (Jazzateria, 1997)
 Down with it (Cannonball, 1998)
 Blue Breakbeats (Blue Note, 1998) – compilation of On Broadway, Love Bug, Blue Mode.
 Organ Blues (Jazzateria, 2002)
 Boogaloo to the Beastie Boys (Scufflin', 2004)
 Fun House (Savant, 2005) – recorded in 2004
 Movin' On (Savant, 2006)
 Azure Te (18th & Vine, 2009)
 Revisited (American Showplace Music, 2011)

With the Wildare Express
 Walk On By (Brunswick, 1970) – recorded in 1967–68

With the Godfathers of Groove
 The Masters of Groove – Meet Dr. No (Jazzateria, 2001)
 The Masters of Groove – Meet DJ-9 (Jazzateria, 2006)
 The Godfathers of Groove (18th & Vine, 2007)
 The Godfathers of Groove – 3 (18th & Vine, 2009)

As sideman
 New York Funkies, Hip Hop Bop! (Meldac [jp], 1995) - with Stanley Turrentine, Ed Cherry
 Grant Green, Jr., Jungle Strut (Venus, 1997)
 Grant Green, Jr., Introducing G.G. (Jazzateria, 2002)
 Melvin Sparks, What You Hear Is What You Get (Savant, 2001)

References

1935 births
Living people
Acid jazz organists
Soul-jazz musicians
American jazz organists
American male organists
Cadet Records artists
Blue Note Records artists
21st-century organists
21st-century American male musicians
American male jazz musicians
21st-century American keyboardists